Kotto may refer to:


People
Maka Kotto (born 1961), Canadian politician and actor
Yaphet Kotto (1939–2021), American actor

Places
Basse-Kotto (Lower Kotto), a prefecture of the Central African Republic
Haute-Kotto (Upper Kotto), a prefecture of the Central African Republic

Other uses
Kotto River, a tributary of the Oubangui River in the Central African Republic

See also
 Koto (disambiguation)
 Cotto (disambiguation)
 Coto (disambiguation)